is a Japanese manga series written and illustrated by Go Nagai. It was serialized in Monthly Shōnen Jump from September 1974 to February 1978, with the chapters collected into five tankōbon volumes by Shueisha.

It follows the misadventures of a student named Mayumi Takahashi who attends a boarding school called Sparta Academy that is run by sadistic psychopaths. The teachers are constantly looking for ways to torture or humiliate the students, and from this the teachers derive sexual satisfaction. Takahashi's only protection is from a mysterious nude female superhero—the titular Kekko Kamen. The manga has spawned an original video animation series and numerous live-action films. In North America, the OVAs were released by ADV Films, while several of the films were published by different distributors.

Plot
First-year student Mayumi Takahashi attends a junior high school called , where the penalty for any student (usually girls) making the slightest mistake is being sexually humiliated by the perverted, corrupt and misogynistic teachers running the school, the principal being a demonic, jester-like villain named "Toenail of Satan". However, before the teachers can take their sexual advances too far, Kekko Kamen steps in and delivers a sound beating to the teachers, and usually performs a finishing attack by jumping into the air and landing crotch-first onto her opponent's face.

Characters

A practically nude female superhero dressed only in a red, rabbit-eared mask, with matching gloves, scarf, and boots. She uses her body to distract the usually male enemy teachers that she fights in order to protect Sparta Academy's unfairly punished and harassed students, but, typically, she ends up coming to the defense of Mayumi Takahashi. She fights with a graceful and acrobatic martial arts style, as well as often using weapons to aid her, such as nunchuks and a bo staff. The possibility of an outside intruder is ruled out, and the principal and faculty thus conclude that one of the students is the masked heroine.

In the last chapter, it is revealed that Kekko Kamen has six secret identities—the belief that she only had one allowed each of her secret identities to remain uncovered, whilst giving each other alibis. In the end, the six are victorious, and the school is shut down, thanks to their efforts.

Portrayed by: Chris Aoki

A first year student at the Sparta Academy. Mayumi is an innocent and good-natured girl, but her failure to meet the school's high academic standards often lands her in the school's torture chamber, where she is subjected to humiliating punishments. However, before the teachers are about to completely violate her, Kekko Kamen always bursts in and save the day. Her heroine's constant rescuing of her has filled Mayumi with a deep amount of affection for her, but she is often used by the principal and faculty as bait to lure Kekko Kamen into a trap.

Portrayed by: Yumi Goto (1991 Movie), Rie Nakano (1992 Movie), Juri Inahara (2004 Movie)

The main antagonist and wicked principal of Sparta Academy, who dresses in a fearsome white demon mask and jester hood. He is extremely perverted and obtains satisfaction from sexually humiliating the bodies of female students, especially that of Mayumi Takahashi. This brings him into conflict with Kekko Kamen, whose secret identity he wishes to uncover, so that he may destroy her. To accomplish this, he exhorts various punishment councillors into publicly humiliate Takahashi, using her as bait to bring the naked warrior of justice out in the open, but she always defeats him.

Portrayed by: Paul Maki, Hajime Tsukumo

A perverted, insane, abusive, sadistic, mad scientist teacher who works for Toenail of Satan. He always punishes Mayumi Takahashi for her substandard grades, but is then put in his place by Kekko Kamen.

A shy, introverted second year student. When Mayumi sees her bare body during an examination intended to unmask Kekko Kamen, her reaction shows that she believes the heroine is Chigusa, but Kekko Kamen suddenly appears and declares that they suspected the wrong person. However, Chigusa actually does have a secret—she is actually two people, the twins Chigusa and Yuka, enrolling as one student due how poor their family is. When their secret is discovered, the twins are accused of being Kekko Kamen, and tortured, but are again cleared of suspicion when Kekko Kamen arrives to save them and Mayumi.

In the last chapter, however, it is revealed that the twins really were Kekko Kamen, alongside four others.

A tough, popular Physical Education teacher, and an expert at various styles of fighting techniques, sports, and with many types of weapons—this caused the principal to suspect that she was actually Kekko Kamen, so he began to humiliate her. This ceased when Kekko Kamen jumped in to rescue her. She would come under suspicion of being Kekko Kamen more than once, and was accused of hiding Kekko Kamen's identity when her sister came under suspicion of being the heroine.

In the last chapter, it is revealed that she indeed was Kekko Kamen, alongside Chigusa, Yuka and three others.

A supposedly first year male student, who is in the same class as Mayumi. However, another student uncovered that "he" was actually a female in disguise. This prompted the Principal to believe that she was Kekko Kamen. When her true gender was unveiled, Keiko suddenly rushed in to save her, and confessed that she was Koichi's older sister. Both sisters were then tortured until Kekko Kamen came to their rescue. After this revelation, Koichi continued to be a valuable friend and ally of Mayumi. She, her sister, and Chigusa would come under suspicion again, but were proven innocent each time.

In the last chapter, she reveals herself to be Kekko Kamen, alongside her sister, the twins Chigusa and Yuka, and two others.

A young student who is positively infatuated with Kekko Kamen, and is inspired to become a heroine of justice herself. However, on her first attempt to combat the evil of the school, Ai finds herself in danger. Fortunately, Kekko Kamen comes to her rescue. After this incident, Ai continued to appear sporadically throughout the manga as a supporting character.

The very attractive school nurse. After Kekko Kamen's thigh is injured in a battle, the villain traces her to the infirmary, and confronts Kaori, ripping off her clothing in an attempt to find the scar, only to discover that it isn't there. Kekko Kamen appears, a bandage on her thigh, rescuing her, and eliminating her as a suspect.

In the last chapter, however, she is revealed to be Kekko Kamen, alongside Chigusa, Yuka, Keiko and Koichi.

A red-haired, chain smoking, tough-as-nails third-year student—she is a gang leader who makes sure everyone knows their place when dealing with her, and she hardly comes to class. When seeing Kei walk away from her, Mayumi is immediately reminded of someone else, but she quickly dismisses the thought.

Shortly afterwards, Mayumi is accosted by Toenail of Satan, and Kekko Kamen jumps in to save her, only to find herself in the midst of a trap. By the end of it, she is captured and unmasked—she is revealed to be Kei. She is then saved by Koichi, who reveals herself as Kekko Kamen—Chigusa, Yuka, Keiko and Kaori reveal themselves to be Kekko Kamen as well, and unite to defeat the Toenail of Satan and the faculty.

Production
Kekko Kamen is a female superhero whose costume consists solely of red boots, gloves, scarf and a mask with long bunny-like ears. Her fighting style is graceful, and her finishing move involves driving the opponent to the ground with a flying headscissors takedown which presses her groin into the victim's face.

Kekko Kamen is a parody of Gekko Kamen. It was originally a joke that Nagai sent to his editor expecting him to reject it. His editor, however, loved the idea and that started Kekko Kamen. The theme song for the Kekko Kamen character uses the same lyrics for the theme song to Moonlight Mask, but with changes.

Media

Manga

The series has been compiled several times by Shueisha and other publishers. It is also available in ebook format, published by ebookjapan. The manga was published in two volumes in Italy by d/visual, on December 22, 2006 and July 30, 2010.

Shueisha (Jump Comics, 1976–1978)

Shueisha (Jump Comics Deluxe, 1990)

Kadokawa Shoten (Kadokawa Bunko, 1996)

Kodansha (Kodansha Comics Deluxe, 2003)

Leed Publishing (SP Comics, 2004)

Original video animation
A four-episode original video animation adaptation of Kekko Kamen was created by Studio Signal and released by Nippon Columbia on two VHS tapes in 1991 and 1992. A DVD collection was released on April 21, 2001. The first two episodes were directed by Nobuhiro Kondo and the second two by Kinji Yoshimoto. The ending theme is  written by Hiroshi Koenji, composed and arranged by Keiju Ishikawa, and sung by Emi Shinohara.

The OVA series was released in the United States subtitled in English on two VHS tapes by ADV Films on February 7 and April 4, 1995. A single DVD version was produced on February 15, 2005, which beside the subtitles, also included dubbed English audio. ADV Films has also re-released Kekko Kamen in bundled DVD packages with other anime; Cutey Honey/Kekko Kamen on April 1, 2008, and Puni Puni Poemy/Kekko Kamen on April 21, 2009. The OVA was also released in a dubbed version in Italy on VHS by Dynamic Italia in 2000 under the name Kekko Kamen: La maschera libidinosa.

Episodes

Live-action films
There have been eleven live-action films based on Kekko Kamen. Go Nagai has been intricately involved in the production of the films. The first three movies and the three from 2006 were released in direct-to-video format, while films four through seven and eleven were theatrically released in Japan. The 2012 film was released theatrically in limited locations before being released on DVD after more than a month. The first four theatrical films were released on DVD in North American by Media Blasters' Tokyo Shock label beginning in 2005.

First series, produced by Japan Home Video
 Kekko Kamen (けっこう仮面)(1991)
 Kekko Kamen 2 (けっこう仮面2)(1992)
 Kekko Kamen 3 (けっこう仮面3)(1993)
Second series, produced by Art Port
 Kekko Kamen: Mask of Kekkou (けっこう仮面 MASK OF KEKKOU)(2003) also known in English as Kekko Kamen New
 Kekko Kamen: Mangriffon no Gyakushu (けっこう仮面 マングリフォンの逆襲)(2003) known in English as Kekko Kamen: The MGF Strikes Back
 Kekko Kamen Returns (けっこう仮面 RETURNS)(2004)
 Kekko Kamen Surprise (けっこう仮面 SURPRISE)(2004)
Third series, produced by Art Port, starring Maria Ozawa
 Kekko Kamen Royale (けっこう仮面 ロワイヤル)(2006)
 Kekko Kamen Premium (けっこう仮面 プレミアム)(2006)
 Kekko Kamen Forever (けっこう仮面 フォーエバー)(2006)
Fourth series, produced by AMG Entertainment, starring Aino Kishi
 Kekko Kamen Reborn  (けっこう仮面 新生)(2012) also known as Mask The Kekkou Reborn

Sequels
 is a manga series written by Shigemitsu Harada and illustrated by Seiju Minato and published in Weekly Young Magazine from 2003 to 2004. The chapters were collected into two tankōbon volumes by Kodansha on May 6 and July 6, 2004. It is a sequel to the original series, where several years have passed since the events depicted in the first manga. Momoka Nogami discovers the legend of the original Kekko Kamen and decides to emulate her actions donning a similar costume, adding a peach motif, and so she becomes Kekko Kamen Peach. Other Kekko also appear, Kekko Kamen Lemon and Kekko Kamen Melon, and even a male version called Kekko Kamen Banana.

A special story called , written by Shinobu Inokuma with co-operation from Nagai, was published in Business Jump in June 2011. It takes place many years after the original manga where a new Kekko Kamen, whose secret identity is a new teacher in a new school owned by the remaining factions of the Toenail of Satan, protects young female students from the evil members of the organisation unfortunately one of them catches her. She is held prisoner until the original Kekko Kamen rescues her and they both defeat him, with the original telling her successor that some of the remains of the Toenail of Satan may have spread all over the world and that she will keep on fighting alone but she was proud of her successor that if she's gone she and her successors after her will always protect the young female women from evil by using her namesake.

A one-shot crossover featuring Go Nagai's Kekko Kamen and Mazinger Z characters was written by Takeshi Okano and published in Grand Jump on January 16, 2013.

Reception 
Stig Høgset of Them Anime Reviews gave the Kekko Kamen OVAs two out of five stars, called the art passable, and clarified that while the jokes are smutty, they never get offensive.

Reviewing for Anime News Network, Theron Martin wrote "Kekko Kamen is great (if nonsensical) fun as long as you're an adult who can appreciate oodles of fan service and raunchy, sometimes utterly tasteless, humor." He cited the humor as a highlight, but felt the production values were mediocre.

Martin gave a much more negative review of the live action Kekko Kamen: Mask of Kekkou (also known as Kekko Kamen New), saying it came off as "exploitive and cruel rather than the campy, whimsical work it should have been." He called the writing amateurish and the acting even worse.

Angel Blade is a hentai parody OVA of Kekko Kamen produced in the Vanilla Series.

American heavy metal musician Rob Zombie used clips of the Kekko Kamen OVA during the 2010 Mayhem Festival and 2022 Freaks on Parade tours during the song "Never Gonna Stop (The Red Red Kroovy)".

See also

Kill la Kill
Shimoneta

References

External links
 Kekko Kamen at the World of Go Nagai fansite 
 

1974 manga
1991 anime OVAs
1991 Japanese novels
2003 manga
ADV Films
Go Nagai
Japanese direct-to-video films
Japanese-language films
Kodansha manga
Light novels
Live-action films based on manga
Manga adapted into films
Shueisha manga
Shōnen manga
Japanese action comedy films